Leonardo's robot, or Leonardo's mechanical knight (Italian: Automa cavaliere, lit. "Automaton knight"), was a humanoid automaton designed and possibly constructed by Leonardo da Vinci around the year 1495.

The design notes for the robot appear in sketchbooks that were rediscovered in the 1950s.  Leonardo is said to have displayed the machine at a celebration hosted by Ludovico Sforza at the court of Milan in 1495. The robot knight could stand, sit, raise its visor and independently manoeuvre its arms, and had an anatomically correct jaw. The entire robotic system was operated by a series of pulleys and cables. Since the discovery of the sketchbook, the robot has been built faithfully based on Leonardo's design and was found to be fully functional.

The robot is described as being clad in German-Italian medieval armor, and is able to make several human-like motions. It is partially a result of Leonardo's anatomical research in the Canon of Proportions as described in the Vitruvian Man.

References

Historical robots
Humanoid robots
Leonardo da Vinci projects
Robots of Italy